Albania has competed at every celebration of the Mediterranean Games since the 1987 Mediterranean Games. As of 2022, Albanian athletes have won a total of 49 medals. The country's ranking in the history of the Games is the 17th place.

History 
Albania participate for the first time in their history at the Mediterranean Games in 1987 Syria. It would be their most successful participanton, as Albania secured eight medals in which they won three gold medals in total. Two by the females in Basketball and Volleyball, and by men Shooter Kirsti Robo. Albania would also secure three medals in Athletics in which Ajet Toska won silver in hammer throw and bronze by Pavlina Evro in the 800 meters run. Albania would finish their first ever Mediterranean Games in 11th place. Their best result so far at this competition.

Medal tables

Medals by Mediterranean Games

Medals by sport

Medals at the Mediterranean Beach Games 

Albania won so far two medals at the Mediterranean Beach Games in which being one Gold and one bronze, since their debut.

Athletes with most medals

The Albanian athletes with the most medals won in the history of the Mediterranean Games is female athlete Luiza Gega, who won three medals in total for Albania. Most recently she won the gold medal for the second time running in her carrier, at the  2022 Mediterranean Games in Oran. The second most successful Albanian medalist at the Mediterranean games is female Weightlifter Romela Begaj she won in total four medals. 
Gold in 2009 and  two medals in 2013 one bronze and silber medals in the Women's -63 kg category. The other one's in this list being male weightlifter Daniel Godelli and Erkand Qerimaj. Each with two medal wins.  

Notes: athletes in bold are still active.

Albanian medalists at the mediterranean Games 

They were plenty of Albanians who did participate for Yugoslavia coming from Kosovo and from Macedonia and for Greece who would win many medals at the Mediterranean Games. In Boxing several athletes of Albanian descent such as Mehmet Bogujevci, Aziz Salihu were successful medal winners for Yugoslavia. Albanians like Shaban Tërstena and Shaban Sejdiu who would win gold medals in Wrestling.

Recently athletes of Albanian descent represented Kosovo at the Mediterranean Games in which Judokas like Majlinda Kelmendi, Nora Gjakova and Akil Gjakova would win gold medals in Judo. Recently Distria Krasniqi and Laura Fazliu won Gold in Judo at the 2022 Mediterranean Games in Oran in Algeria.

It does not represent the actual medal table, as it is just a table of how many medals were won by Albanians athletes who did not compete for Albania at those competition's.

See also
Albania at the Olympics
Albania at the Paralympics
Sport in Albania

References

External links